Cycloprorodes is a genus of moths in the family Geometridae.

Species
 Cycloprorodes melanoxysta (Meyrick, 1892)

References
 Cycloprorodes at Markku Savela's Lepidoptera and Some Other Life Forms
 Natural History Museum Lepidoptera genus database

Ennominae